Lincoln High School is a public high school in Gahanna, Ohio, United States. It is in the Gahanna-Jefferson Public Schools district.

History 

The current school building opened in 1928 in what is now known as Lincoln Hall. Multiple expansions have been made to the building, most recently with the addition of Clark Hall in 2011.

The name 'Lincoln High School' is a result of an early struggle between the city of Gahanna and Jefferson Township. Despite being considered as an option, Jefferson High School was not chosen, and the City and Township compromised, naming the school Lincoln High School.

Lincoln High School's mascot is the Lion, giving rise to the nickname the "Home of the Lions." The school colors are Royal Blue and Athletic Gold. The  campus is made up of three buildings, named "Lincoln", "Jefferson", and "Hamilton". This compound, along with athletic facilities, district administration building and Lincoln Elementary, takes up nearly an entire block, bounded on the north by Havens Corners Road, and on the west by South Hamilton Road. The original 1928 building, renovated in 1987, is known today as Lincoln Hall.  The 2000 addition is known as Jefferson Hall and was built to replace the previous C Building which stood where the entrance to the stadium is today.  Hamilton Hall was originally constructed in 1963 and had additions in 1982 (an auditorium, a library, a band room, and an auxiliary gym) and 1995 (science classrooms, theater and TV classrooms, a choir room, a new main office complex and a second cafeteria).  The three buildings are all connected by inner hallways, however they can also all be accessed by outside doors.  Starting in the 2011-2012 school year the names Hamilton, Lincoln, and Jefferson Hall replaced the names A, B, and C Building, respectively.

Athletics 
Gahanna's athletic teams compete in the Ohio Division of the Ohio Capital Conference (OCC).

The high school offers the following sports:  Boys:  Cross Country, Golf, Football & Soccer in the Fall; Basketball, Wrestling, Swimming, Bowling, & Ice Hockey in the Winter;  Baseball, Track & Field, Tennis, Volleyball and Lacrosse in the Spring.
Girls:  Cheerleading, Cross Country, Golf, Soccer, Volleyball & Tennis in the Fall; Basketball, Bowling, Swimming, Cheerleading in the Winter; and Softball, Track & Field and Lacrosse in the Spring.

The school claims six team state titles: two in boys track and field (1979 and 2009), one in boys soccer (2009), one in girls bowling (2017–18), and two titles in girls track (2015, 2018) The school has been State Runner-up in: Football (1976), Boys Volleyball (1991); Softball (2003 & 2011) and has played in the State Final Four in Boys Basketball (2010), Softball (1980, 1982, 2016) and Baseball (2013, 2014).

A new synthetic turf athletic field was installed in 2008 and replaced in 2018 to allow many sports to be played in the main stadium including football, soccer and lacrosse as well as uses by Physical Education Classes, marching band and other teams for conditioning. The field was named the "Wib Strait, Sr. Field" in honor of Mr. Strait, a LHS Alum and lifetime Gahanna resident. Mr. Strait's family donated the funds for the first turf field in 2008. The locker room used by the football and boys track and field teams was renamed the "John Hickman Locker Room" in honor and memory of Mr. Hickman who served LHS for 45+ years in roles including: coach, teacher, head athletic trainer and Equipment Manager for many sports. Mr. Hickman was also a top ranked track and field official for the OHSAA and officiated at the 1996 Summer Olympics in Atlanta.

Ohio High School Athletic Association state championships 
 Boys Track and Field – 1979, 2009.
 Boys Soccer – 2009
 Girls Track and Field - 2015 (shared with Cincinnati Withrow), 2018

Notable alumni 
 Camaron Cheeseman, American football player
 Jonathon Cooper, American football player
 Mike Faist, award-winning actor and singer
 John Hughes, American football player
 Phil Klein, baseball player
 Wil Trapp, soccer player
 Evan White, baseball player

References

External links 
 

High schools in Franklin County, Ohio
Gahanna, Ohio
Educational institutions established in 1882
Public high schools in Ohio
1882 establishments in Ohio